Marcus Macauley (born 27 October 1991) is a Liberian professional footballer who plays as a midfielder for Malaysian club PDRM. He is also a member of the Liberia national football team.

Honors 
Al-Ahli
Jordan FA Cup: 2015–16

Individual

 Monrovia Breweries F.C. Best Player, 3 Times
 (LSWAL) Best Three Midfielders Award (2010)
 Sport Analyst News Paper Player of the year Award (2008)

International career and goals
Marcus was first called up to join the Liberia national football team in a match against Zimbabwe and he scored his first International Goal in  September 2013 at the Tundavala National Stadium in Lubango.

International goals

References

1991 births
Living people
Association football midfielders
Liberian footballers
Liberian expatriate footballers
Liberia international footballers
Monrovia Club Breweries players
Al-Ahli SC (Amman) players
Al-Yarmouk FC (Jordan) players
Shabab Al-Aqaba Club players
Sahab SC players
Al Jeel Club players
Saudi First Division League players
Expatriate footballers in Jordan
Jordanian Pro League players
Expatriate footballers in Saudi Arabia